The 2018 Monster Energy NASCAR Cup Series was the 70th season of NASCAR professional stock car racing in the United States, and the 47th modern-era Cup series season. The season began at Daytona International Speedway with the Advance Auto Parts Clash, the Can-Am Duel qualifying races and the 60th running of the Daytona 500. The regular season ended with the Brickyard 400 on September 9, 2018. The playoffs ended with the Ford EcoBoost 400 at Homestead-Miami Speedway on November 18, 2018. Martin Truex Jr. was the defending champion, having won his first in the series.

The 2018 season was the fourth of the current 10-year television contract with Fox Sports and NBC Sports and the third of a five-year race sanctioning agreement with all tracks. It is the first season to feature the Regular Season Championship trophy, which is awarded at the final race before the playoffs. Kyle Busch clinched the MENCS Regular Season Championship trophy at the end of Stage 2 of the 2018 Brickyard 400.

The season marked the debut of the Chevrolet Camaro ZL1, which replaced the outgoing Chevrolet SS and became the first coupe-based Chevrolet stock car since the Monte Carlo SS was discontinued in 2017. This was also the last season for Kasey Kahne, who announced his intention to retire from racing at the end of the season and was forced to step away in early October 2018 after not being medically cleared to continue, as well as BK Racing who sold its equipment to Front Row Motorsports, and Furniture Row Racing, which ceased operations after 2018. It was also the final season Ford fielded the Fusion, replacing it with the Ford Mustang in 2019.

Joey Logano, driving for Team Penske in a Ford won the championship, after defeating Martin Truex Jr., Kevin Harvick and Kyle Busch in a 1–2–3–4 finish for the "Championship 4" at the final round at Homestead. Logano won three races during the course of the season, having also won the spring race at Talladega and the fall race at Martinsville. Austin Dillon was the Daytona 500 winner. Kyle Busch and Harvick won the most races with eight each, with Denny Hamlin and seven-time series champion Jimmie Johnson concluding their first winless seasons in full-time Cup competition. The 2018 season also marked the fifteenth consecutive and final time that Johnson made the playoffs since its inception in 2004. Erik Jones and Chase Elliott won their first career victories and William Byron became Rookie of the Year.

Teams and drivers

Chartered teams

Limited schedule

Changes

Teams
 Team Penske will expand to a three-car team with the addition of Ryan Blaney in the No. 12, previously with Wood Brothers Racing in the No. 21 in 2017.
 On August 29, 2017, Hendrick Motorsports announced that the current No. 24 team driven by Chase Elliott would be changing to the No. 9 team, while the No. 5 would become the new No. 24 team to be driven by rookie William Byron. Alan Gustafson is expected to remain as Elliott's crew chief while Darian Grubb will work with William Byron.
 Furniture Row Racing will downsize from a two car team to a one car team, shutting down the No. 77 team as sponsor 5-hour Energy moves to the No. 78 team.
 On September 25, 2017, it was announced that a new Chevrolet team, StarCom Racing, would open and run the No. 00 car full-time, with driver Derrike Cope, moving from Premium Motorsports. Cope was planning to drive the majority of the 2018 schedule with other drivers possibly running races, however, Jeffrey Earnhardt was later announced as the driver for the season. The No. 00 is also guaranteed to run every race as they have leased a charter from the part-time Richard Childress Racing No. 8 team. Cope will instead run a second car later in the season, the No. 99 Camaro. After Fontana, Earnhardt and StarCom mutually agreed to part ways. After starting the season without a ride, Landon Cassill would take over the 00 for Martinsville, Texas, Bristol, Richmond and possibly the rest of the season. Joey Gase was later announced as the driver for Talladega and road course ringer Tomy Drissi was announced as the driver for Sonoma. The No. 99 would debut with Cope at the first Dover race of the season.
 On November 14, 2017, JTG Daugherty Racing announced that they will switch their technical alliance from Richard Childress Racing to Hendrick Motorsports in the 2018 season.
 On November 22, 2017, Rick Ware Racing announced an expansion from a 30-race open team to one full-time team for Ray Black Jr. and one part-time team for Cody Ware, Kyle Weatherman, B. J. McLeod and John Graham. However, before the season began, the deal with Black fell through, but Black will still drive the No. 51 at Daytona in July. RWR has fielded the No. 51 for Black, Justin Marks, Cole Custer, Harrison Rhodes, Timmy Hill, Cody Ware, B.J. McLeod, and Chris Cook. The No. 52 would make its debut at Sonoma with Cody Ware.
 On December 7, 2017, after it was announced that Richard Petty Motorsports would be switching manufacturers from Ford to Chevrolet, RPM also announced that in 2018 they would have a technical alliance with Richard Childress Racing.
 On December 12, 2017, it was announced that Circle Sport Racing and The Motorsports Group, who became one team in 2017, parted ways. Both teams will field a car for 2018. Circle Sport will continue with the No. 33, but Jeffrey Earnhardt was released even though he was going to be the No. 33 driver in 2018. Both teams will have different drivers and sponsors.
 On January 3, 2018, it was announced that Team Penske had purchased a charter from Roush Fenway Racing in order to field the No. 12 car for Ryan Blaney full-time in 2018. The charter had been leased to JTG Daugherty Racing to field the No. 37 for Chris Buescher in 2017, and had previously been used for the No. 16 of Greg Biffle in 2016.
 On January 17, 2018, it was announced that RBR Enterprises will join the Cup series and will field the No. 92 Ford to attempt the Daytona 500 with David Gilliland behind the wheel. The team spent the past eight seasons competing 79 races in the Truck series.
 On January 22, 2018, it was announced that Gaunt Brothers Racing will return to the Daytona 500 with D. J. Kennington driving the No. 96 Toyota. The team entered the spring ISM Raceway race, which would be their first appearance on a non-restrictor track. 
 On January 23, 2018, Richard Childress Racing announced that it will downsize to two full-time teams and one part-time team for 2018, the No. 27 team will be renumbered as the No. 8 and it will run two races with Daniel Hemric.
 On April 25, 2018, Roush Fenway Racing announced that Matt Kenseth will reunite with RFR and will share the No. 6 car with Trevor Bayne for the 2018 season.
 On August 5, 2018, Leavine Family Racing announced that its technical alliance with Richard Childress Racing will end after the 2018 season.
 On August 23, 2018, Front Row Motorsports purchased majority of the assets of the bankrupt BK Racing for $2.08 million, outbidding GMS Racing offer of $1.8 million. In addition, the trustee of BK Racing sold some secondary assets to Obaika Racing for $265,000 and a tractor to Rick Ware Racing to $35,000.
 On September 4, 2018, it was announced that Furniture Row Racing would cease operations after the 2018 season, making defending champion Martin Truex Jr. a free agent for 2019.
 On September 12, 2018, NASCAR collaborated with the Race Team Alliance and Twitter to unveil customized hashtags and emojis for the top 16 drivers entering the playoffs. Each driver will have their hashtag and emoji displayed on the sides of their cars until they are eliminated from contention. Non-playoff drivers can have their hashtags and the Twitter logo displayed on their cars. This was in effect until the 2018 Hollywood Casino 400. From the 2018 First Data 500 to the 2018 Can-Am 500, all hashtag and emoji labels were replaced with the NBC logo. On November 12, 2018, NASCAR partnered with Snapchat to have all cars sport Snapcodes at the season-ending 2018 Ford EcoBoost 400.
 On October 5, 2018, Obaika Racing announced that they would attempt their first ever MENCS race at Talladega Superspeedway, fielding the No. 97 Space Grill Toyota Camry for the 2018 1000Bulbs.com 500 with David Starr. The team ultimately failed to qualify in the race, but made the field with Starr in their second attempt at the fall Texas race.

Drivers
 On April 25, 2017, Dale Earnhardt Jr. announced that he would retire from full-time racing. On July 20, 2017, Alex Bowman was announced as his full-time replacement.
 On July 11, 2017, it was announced that Erik Jones will be replacing Matt Kenseth in the No. 20 car for Joe Gibbs Racing. On November 4, 2017, Kenseth announced he would be stepping away from full-time racing and will not compete in any 2018 events, but on April 25, 2018, it was announced that Kenseth would drive the No. 6 part-time along with Trevor Bayne for Roush Fenway Racing.
 On July 26, 2017, it was announced that Paul Menard will replace Ryan Blaney in the No. 21 car for Wood Brothers Racing.
 On August 1, 2017, it was announced that Kurt Busch will become a free agent after driving the No. 41 car for Stewart-Haas Racing. However, on December 11, 2017, it was announced that Busch had re-signed with Stewart-Haas Racing on a 1-year deal.
 On August 7, 2017, it was announced that Kasey Kahne would be leaving the No. 5 Hendrick Motorsports car at the end of 2017. On August 8, 2017, it was announced that William Byron was named as his full-time replacement in the renumbered No. 24 car and will be running for Rookie of the Year honors. On September 19, 2017, it was announced that Kahne would be driving the No. 95 Chevrolet Camaro ZL1 for Leavine Family Racing, replacing Michael McDowell.
 On September 12, 2017, Danica Patrick announced that she would not be returning to Stewart-Haas Racing in 2018. Later that day, Richard Petty Motorsports announced that Aric Almirola would not be returning to the No. 43 team in 2018. On October 25, 2017, Richard Petty Motorsports announced that Bubba Wallace would drive the No. 43 and compete for Rookie of the Year Honors. In 2017, Wallace Jr. was going to run the full NASCAR Xfinity Series schedule driving the No. 6 Ford Mustang GT for Roush Fenway Racing, but the team shut down in June due to a lack of sponsorship. Wallace would also drive the No. 43 in the Cup series, filling in for Almirola when he was injured in a crash at Kansas. Wallace also drove the No. 98 Ford Mustang GT for Biagi-DenBeste Racing in the Xfinity Series at Chicago, and the No. 99 Chevrolet Silverado for MDM Motorsports in the NASCAR Camping World Truck Series at Michigan.
 On September 25, 2017, Derrike Cope announced he would leave the No. 55 car of Premium Motorsports to drive the new No. 99 for StarCom Racing. Cope also serves as Team Manager, and the No. 00 team will run the full schedule after securing a charter and Landon Cassill will drive the majority of the schedule.
 On October 10, 2017, Front Row Motorsports announced that Landon Cassill would not return to drive the team's No. 34 entry in 2018. On December 14, 2017, it has been confirmed that Michael McDowell will drive full-time in the No. 34, and David Ragan is returning to FRM in the No. 38.
 On November 8, 2017, Stewart-Haas Racing announced that Aric Almirola would take over the No. 10 Ford full-time in 2018, replacing Danica Patrick.
 On November 15, 2017, it was announced that Danica Patrick would be retiring from auto racing. She planned to race in the 2018 Daytona 500 (NASCAR) and the 2018 Indy 500 (IndyCar) before retiring.
 On November 22, 2017, it was announced that Ray Black Jr. would compete full-time and challenge for Rookie of the Year with Rick Ware Racing's No. 51 chartered entry. The No. 51 did not have a charter in 2017. RWR also announced a part-time No. 52 team with drivers Cody Ware, Kyle Weatherman, B. J. McLeod and John Graham. However, in early February, it was that Justin Marks would drive the No. 51 in the Daytona 500, even though Ray Black Jr. was announced as the full-time driver. It is rumored that the deal fell through. Marks, Black, Cole Custer, Harrison Rhodes, Timmy Hill, Cody Ware, B.J. McLeod, and Chris Cook all made starts in the car. The No. 52 would make its debut at Sonoma with Cody Ware.
 On January 30, 2018, StarCom Racing signed Jeffrey Earnhardt to drive its chartered No. 00 Chevrolet for the season. Earnhardt replaces Derrike Cope, who will remain as team manager and also will drive a second car for the team later in the year. Earnhardt previously drove for Circle Sport – The Motorsports Group full-time in 2017. After the first 5 races, Earnhardt was replaced by Landon Cassill. Joey Gase was later announced as the driver for Talladega and road course ringer Tomy Drissi was announced as the driver for Sonoma.
 On February 5, 2018, TriStar Motorsports announced that Corey LaJoie would split the chartered No. 72 team with Cole Whitt, with sponsorship from Schluter Systems. LaJoie previously drove for BK Racing's Nos. 23 and 83 in most of the races in 2017.
 On March 20, 2018, Richard Childress Racing announced that Daniel Hemric would drive a part-time No. 8 car in the Cup Series during the Richmond spring race and the during the playoffs on the new Charlotte "Roval" course.
 On August 16, 2018, Kasey Kahne announced his retirement from full-time racing following the 2018 season. After suffering from heat exhaustion at the 2018 Bojangles' Southern 500, Kahne was replaced by Regan Smith as the Leavine Family Racing No. 95 driver at the 2018 Brickyard 400. On October 9, 2018, Kahne announced that he will not continue racing for the rest of the 2018 season.

Crew chiefs
 Jeremy Bullins will move over from the No. 21 Wood Brothers Racing team to the new No. 12 Team Penske team to continue to be Ryan Blaney's crew chief.
 Greg Erwin will move from the No. 22 Team Penske team in the NASCAR Xfinity Series to the No. 21 Wood Brothers Racing team to be Paul Menard's crew chief.
 Travis Mack will move from being the car chief for the No. 88 Hendrick Motorsports team to the No. 95 Leavine Family Racing team to be Kasey Kahne's crew chief. After Michigan in June, Mack was removed and replaced by Jon Leonard in the short term.
 Championship winning crew chief Darian Grubb will be the crew chief for the No. 24 Hendrick Motorsports team and William Byron. In 2017, Grubb was the crew chief for Kasey Kahne in the final 9 races of the season after Keith Rodden left as the crew chief role.
 Bootie Barker will leave the No. 13 team at the end of the 2017 season. On November 27, 2017, Germain Racing announced that Matt Borland will move over from the No. 27 Richard Childress Racing team to be the crew chief for Ty Dillon.
 Jason Ratcliff will move over from the No. 20 Joe Gibbs Racing team to the No. 20 JGR team in the NASCAR Xfinity Series to be the crew chief for Christopher Bell. Chris Gayle moves over from the now shut down No. 77 Furniture Row Racing team to continue to be Erik Jones' crew chief.
 Eddie Pardue will move with The Motorsports Group and be the crew chief. Pardue was the crew chief for the No. 33 for Circle Sport-The Motorsports Group until the two teams split after the 2017 season. 
 On December 15, 2017, Tony Gibson announced his retirement. Johnny Klausmeier, who served as car chief on the No. 41 team, will be the crew chief for Aric Almirola, while Billy Scott moves from the No. 10 team to the No. 41 to be crew chief for Kurt Busch.
 On February 27, 2018, Go Fas Racing announced Randy Cox would take over crew chief duties for the No. 32 team, replacing Gene Nead.
 On October 9, 2018, Joe Gibbs Racing announced that Dave Rogers will replace Scott Graves as the crew chief of the No. 19 team.
 On November 7, 2018, NASCAR suspended Rodney Childers of the Stewart-Haas Racing No. 4 team for the last two races of the season after a post-race inspection following the team's win at Texas discovered an unapproved spoiler. He was replaced by Tony Gibson for the remainder of the season.

Manufacturers
 With the discontinuation of the SS after the 2017 model year, Chevrolet unveiled a new body style based on the Camaro ZL1.
 MBM Motorsports purchased an old Richard Petty Motorsports Ford and ran it in the Daytona 500 with Mark Thompson behind the wheel. MBM ran Chevrolets and Toyotas in 2017. MBM Motorsports would return to using Toyotas for most of the remainder of 2018 starting at Bristol with Chad Finchum.
 After running Chevrolets for the 2017 season, Rick Ware Racing announced that they will run with all three manufacturers in 2018.
 On December 7, 2017, Richard Petty Motorsports announced that they would be switching manufacturers from Ford to Chevrolet for the 2018 season. Richard Petty Motorsports ran Fords from 2010 to 2017 and last ran a General Motors car in 2000.
 BK Racing switched manufacturers from Toyota to Ford at the 2018 1000Bulbs.com 500 at Talladega before reverting to Toyota at the 2018 Hollywood Casino 400 at Kansas.
 This will be the final year of the Ford Fusion as on April 17, 2018, Ford announced the Ford Mustang as their entry in the Cup series for 2019.

Offseason changes

Rule changes
During its annual media tour in November 2017, NASCAR announced that constraints would be imposed on crew rosters in its three national series. Crew members are divided into "Organizational", "Road Crew", and "Pit Crew" roles; in the Cup Series, a single team may only have a roster of 3-4 organizational crew members (depending on the number of cars they field), 12 road crew members, and 5 pit crew members (reduced from 6, as implemented in 2011). Crew members must be assigned a jersey number and a letter corresponding to their position, which must be worn on their crew uniforms. Staff may be shared between a team's individual cars, even if they are not explicitly listed on their roster. NASCAR's executive vice president and chief racing development officer Steve O'Donnell stated that these changes were intended to improve safety, as well as improve its focus on teamwork.

In February 2018, it was announced that the vehicle damage policy introduced in 2017 had been modified, following analysis of the rule's effects in 2017, and to account for the reduction in pit crew members. The length of the repair window has been extended to six minutes, and the penalty for having too many crew members repairing the car was reduced from disqualification to a two-lap penalty. Additionally, the length of the first session in qualifying on intermediate- and short-tracks has been reduced from 20 to 15 minutes.

On May 16, 2018, NASCAR announced that teams no longer need to start the race on the tires used in qualifying, due to teams that fail to pass the inspection before qualifying getting an advantage.

Schedule
The final schedule – comprising 36 races, as well as exhibition races, which are the Advance Auto Parts Clash, Can-Am Duel qualifying duel races for the Daytona 500 and the All-Star Race – was released on May 23, 2017.
Key changes from 2017 include:
 The Daytona 500 is held one week earlier. As a result of this, all races from Atlanta until Talladega (spring), and also Pocono and Michigan in June will move one week earlier than 2017.
 The Toyota Owners 400 at Richmond Raceway will move from Sunday afternoon to Saturday night due to attendance issues.
 The AAA 400 Drive for Autism will move after the GEICO 500 and before the KC Masterpiece 400. Due to Daytona moving a week earlier, Dover was forced to move to May, similar to 2016 and (some) years before that when Daytona was on Presidents Day Weekend.
 The new date that Las Vegas Motor Speedway acquired from New Hampshire Motor Speedway was moved to the first race of playoffs to replace Overton's 400 at Chicagoland Speedway which moved back to July before the Coke Zero Sugar 400. That means the Coke Zero Sugar 400, Quaker State 400 and Foxwoods Resort Casino 301 will move one week later than 2017.
 The Big Machine Vodka 400 at the Brickyard at Indianapolis Motor Speedway will move to September to become the final race of the regular season while the Federated Auto Parts 400 at Richmond Raceway will move to the second race in the Round of 16.
 The Bank of America 500 at Charlotte Motor Speedway will move one week earlier to become the elimination race of the Round of 16 and will utilize the track's road course layout instead of its quad-oval. The race's scheduled distance will also be shortened from 500 miles to 400 kilometers, resulting in a name change to the Bank of America Roval 400. That means the Gander Outdoors 400 at Dover International Speedway will move one week later to become the first race of the Round of 12.
 In broadcasting changes, an additional off week in June was added for the Father's Day weekend between Michigan and Sonoma so that the Fox networks could air the U.S. Open and the 2018 FIFA World Cup. The third off week will be after Bristol's August race.

Crown Jewel races in bold

Schedule changes 
In 2015, NASCAR and 23 Monster Energy NASCAR Cup Series tracks agreed on a five-year contract that guarantees each track would continue to host races through 2020. Despite the agreement, Speedway Motorsports decided to transfer one of its Cup Series races at New Hampshire Motor Speedway to Las Vegas Motor Speedway to form a race weekend involving each of the three national series in the fall. On July 27, 2016, Daytona International Speedway announced that the 60th running of the Daytona 500 would be moved one week earlier to be held on February 18, 2018.

Several changes were announced with the release of the final schedule. The Big Machine Vodka 400 at the Brickyard at Indianapolis Motor Speedway moved to September to become the final race of the regular season, while the Federated Auto Parts 400 at Richmond Raceway moved to the second race in the Round of 16. The new date that Las Vegas Motor Speedway acquired from New Hampshire Motor Speedway was moved to the first race of the playoffs to replace Chicagoland Speedway, which became race 17 of the regular season. Dover International Speedway's spring race, the AAA 400 Drive for Autism, was moved one month early to precede Kansas Speedway and Charlotte Motor Speedway. The track's fall race, the Gander Outdoors 400, was moved one week later to become the first race of the Round of 12. Also, Charlotte Motor Speedway's Bank of America 500 moves one week earlier and will utilize the track's road course layout instead of its quad-oval; with the scheduled distance changing from 500 miles to 400 kilometers, the race will now be known as the Bank of America Roval 400. With an additional off-week in the schedule for 2018, the Father's Day off-week that FOX added for the U.S. Open and the 2018 FIFA World Cup will be restored, with the third off-week being after the Bristol August race.

Season summary

Race reports
Speedweeks 2018

Daytona Speedweeks started with the Advance Auto Parts Clash. Austin Dillon drew the pole as Chase Elliott and Brad Keselowski led the majority of the race. Jamie McMurray crashed and Ricky Stenhouse Jr. received a penalty. Keselowski led the last half to win over Joey Logano as Jimmie Johnson crashed after contact with Kyle Larson with Chase Elliott, Kasey Kahne, Kyle Busch, and Martin Truex Jr. also getting involved.

In Daytona 500 qualifying, Alex Bowman won the pole while Denny Hamlin qualified second. Bowman won the pole for his first race since taking over the No. 88 car from Dale Earnhardt Jr. full-time. This was the fourth consecutive Daytona 500 pole won by Hendrick Motorsports.

In the Can-Am Duels on Thursday, Bowman was on pole for race one. In the early laps, Jimmie Johnson lost a tire and crashed along with Aric Almirola. Ricky Stenhouse Jr. was moving around the entire race, but got into both William Byron and David Gilliland, taking them out. Joey Logano led the majority of laps, but was passed for the lead by Ryan Blaney as Brad Keselowski crashed with Jamie McMurray, sending the race into overtime. In overtime, Blaney held off Joey Logano and Bubba Wallace to win the first Duel. In the second Duel, Hamlin was on pole. Early in the race, Erik Jones spun and collected Kyle Larson and Matt DiBenedetto. Hamlin and Chase Elliott led most of the race. Elliott led the most laps to win his second straight Duel race over Kevin Harvick.

Round 1: Daytona 500

Alex Bowman started on pole. Early on, Kyle Busch had a tire go down and had to pit. Later, Busch had another tire down and got into the wall and collected Jamie McMurray and D. J. Kennington. In the closing laps of stage one, Erik Jones spun and collected Kyle Larson, Jimmie Johnson, Daniel Suarez, William Byron, and Ty Dillon as Kurt Busch won stage one. In stage two, Byron got into the wall after having a tire go down. Brad Keselowski got into Chase Elliott and collected others including David Ragan, Kevin Harvick, Kasey Kahne, and Danica Patrick, who finished 35th in her final NASCAR race. Ryan Blaney won stage two over Joey Logano. In the final stage, Blaney continued to lead. In the closing laps, Byron again had a tire go down and spun. With two laps to go, Kurt Busch got turned around and collected Blaney, Matt DiBenedetto, Brendan Gaughan, and others, sending the race to overtime. In overtime, Aric Almirola was leading at the white flag, and tried to block Austin Dillon, but the block was late and Almirola ended up in the wall. Austin Dillon held off Bubba Wallace for his second career win and winning the Daytona 500 in the No. 3 20 years after Dale Earnhardt won his only 500 in 1998.

Round 2: Folds of Honor QuikTrip 500

Kyle Busch led the field to the green flag after an hour delay from rain. Ryan Newman jumped out to an early lead, but Busch was able to reclaim the lead. After the end-of-stage caution, Newman had a tire go down and hit the wall. Kevin Harvick led and won the first stage. In the second stage, Harvick, Kurt Busch, and Brad Keselowski all led as Keselowski won stage two after a spin by Jimmie Johnson. In the final stage, Harvick continued to dominate as Denny Hamlin and Joey Logano tried to win on a different strategy as the rest of the field. Late in the final stage, Trevor Bayne had an engine failure as Bubba Wallace plowed into Ricky Stenhouse Jr. trying to avoid the smoke. Harvick continued to lead and won over Keselowski for his first win at Atlanta since 2001.

Round 3: Pennzoil 400

Ryan Blaney started on pole. Kevin Harvick took the lead at the beginning and dominated and won the first two caution free stages. In the final stage, Jamie McMurray got into the wall after a flat tire. Kurt Busch got loose and crashed along with Chase Elliott. Harvick led over 200 laps and held off a hard charging Kyle Busch for his second straight win and second at Las Vegas.

Round 4: TicketGuardian 500

Martin Truex Jr. started on pole. Kyle Larson shot out to the lead early and led most of the first stage. Kyle Busch took the lead and won the first stage. Early in the second stage, Larson spun on the apron. Chris Buescher had a tire go down and got into the wall. Kurt Busch stayed out and won the second stage. Denny Hamlin took the lead as Paul Menard had a tire go down and got into the wall. Kyle Busch regained the lead until green flag pit stops. Brad Keselowski stayed out to stretch it out until the end, but had to pit. Kevin Harvick was able to pass Chase Elliott during the green flag cycle to take the lead from Ryan Newman and hold off Kyle Busch for his third consecutive win and ninth at Phoenix.

Round 5: Auto Club 400

Martin Truex Jr. started on pole for the second straight week. Early, Kevin Harvick got into the wall and spun through the grass after contact with Kyle Larson, ending his chances for a fourth straight win. Truex was able to win the first stage and win the second stage after Trevor Bayne got into the wall. David Ragan brought out the final caution as Truex was able to beat out Kyle Busch on pit stops and pulled away from Larson to sweep all three stages to win.

Round 6: STP 500

Martin Truex Jr. started on pole for the third straight week as qualifying was cancelled due to rain and snow. The race was postponed from Sunday to Monday due to snow. Denny Hamlin won the first stage after a Competition Caution and Ryan Blaney won the second stage. Jamie McMurray spun after contact with Austin Dillon. Clint Bowyer took the lead from Blaney and dominated the remainder of the race, leading 215 laps. McMurray, Trevor Bayne, and Harrison Rhodes all had tires go down, but there was no caution. Bowyer held off Kyle Busch for his first win since 2012 and the fourth out of six races for Stewart-Haas Racing.

Round 7: O'Reilly Auto Parts 500

Kurt Busch started on pole after qualifying was cancelled just after the first round due to rain. As soon as the race began, Alex Bowman spun and collected Aric Almirola, Austin Dillon, and Paul Menard. At the end of the first stage, Martin Truex Jr. had a tire go down and got into the wall as Kevin Harvick scored the stage win as it ended under caution. In the second stage, Kyle Larson had a tire go down and he got into the wall. Kyle Busch was able to win the second stage. Early in the final stage, Denny Hamlin spun and collected David Ragan, Brad Keselowski, and Jimmie Johnson. Menard and Ryan Newman both got into the wall. Kyle Busch and Harvick, both with older tires, were able to stay out front and Busch was able to hold Harvick off for his first win of the year and third at Texas.

Round 8: Food City 500

Kyle Busch started on pole. Michael McDowell spun on the third lap and collected others including Chase Elliott and Martin Truex Jr. The race was stopped three different times due to rain and a wreck by Trevor Bayne. Ryan Blaney led most of the first half of the race, but was caught up in an accident while leading, ending his race. Brad Keselowski won the first stage. After another red flag due to rain, the remainder of the race was postponed to Monday. After a small delay due to rain, the race continued. Keselowski would win the second stage after taking back the lead. Kyle Larson took back the lead and continued leading until spun after making contact with Ryan Newman. Kyle Busch got the lead when the caution was displayed for rain, but it was a brief yellow. On the final restart, Larson got back in the lead, but Kyle Busch passed Larson for the lead with six laps to go and Busch pulled away to his second straight win and seventh at Bristol.

Round 9: Toyota Owners 400

Martin Truex Jr. won the pole. Joey Logano dominated the early part of the race, winning both stages. Kurt Busch and Clint Bowyer took turned swapping the lead. Truex regained the lead and lead a race high of 121 laps. Ryan Blaney and Ricky Stenhouse Jr. got together and spun. Jamie McMurray got into the wall and made contact with Ryan Newman, who blew up. David Ragan had a tire go down and got into the wall. Stenhouse spun again to send the race into overtime. On the restart, Kyle Busch held off Chase Elliott for his third straight win and fifth at Richmond.

Round 10: GEICO 500

Kevin Harvick started the race from the pole. Brad Keselowski won the first stage of the race. In the second stage, Erik Jones caused a multicar wreck that collected Jamie McMurray, Kyle Larson, Martin Truex Jr., and Trevor Bayne. Paul Menard won the second stage of the race. Numerous drivers experienced speeding penalties on pit road including Denny Hamlin, who was caught speeding on pit road multiple times. Late in the race, Jimmie Johnson got loose in front of teammate William Byron and caused a 14-car accident that also collected Keselowski, Menard, Clint Bowyer, Michael McDowell, Ryan Blaney, Bubba Wallace, and A. J. Allmendinger. Joey Logano led in the closing laps of the race and went to score his first win of the season, ending a 36 race winless streak.

Round 11: AAA 400 Drive for Autism

Kyle Larson started on pole. Michael McDowell spun and Derrike Cope crashed early as Kevin Harvick won both stages. Kyle Busch went to the garage after suffering a broken driveshaft. Clint Bowyer was leading when the race was halted by a red flag due to rain. After the delay, Kevin Harvick passed Bowyer for the lead and pulled away for his second win at Dover and his fourth win of the season.

Round 12: KC Masterpiece 400

Kevin Harvick started on pole. Harvick led early, but Ryan Blaney took the lead and won the first stage. Kyle Larson came from the rear of the field to dominate the race, winning the second stage. Alex Bowman and Daniel Suarez got together and both got into the wall. Larson and Blaney got into each other, putting Blaney in the wall. On the restart, William Byron had a tire go down caused a wreck featuring Clint Bowyer, Ryan Newman, Ty Dillon, Jamie McMurray, Chris Buescher, and Matt Kenseth, competing in his first race of the year, bringing out the red flag. On the restart, Martin Truex Jr. pulled away from the field, but Kevin Harvick was able run down Truex to take the lead for his second consecutive win and his fifth of the season.

Exhibition: Monster Energy NASCAR All-Star Race

First, it was the Monster Energy Open. Aric Almirola started on pole due to qualifying being rained out. Almirola led early, but Alex Bowman took the lead and won the first stage to transfer. In the second stage, Paul Menard got into the wall. Chase Elliott had the lead, but Daniel Suárez took the lead and won the second stage to transfer. Bubba Wallace led in the final stage, but Elliott got back into the lead. Alimrola and Erik Jones got into each other as A. J. Allmendinger took the lead and held off Eliott to win his second Open to transfer. Chase Eliott won the fan vote to transfer for the third straight year.

Matt Kenseth won the pole for the race. Kurt Busch spun early as Kevin Harvick won the first stage and Kyle Busch won the second stage. In the third stage, Kasey Kahne got into the wall. Martin Truex Jr. got into Clint Bowyer and they crashed with Kurt Busch, Kyle Busch, and Brad Keselowski. Harvick got by Daniel Suárez to win the third stage. In the final 10 laps, Harvick was out front as Kyle Larson spun after contact with Joey Logano. In a two lap shootout, Kevin Harvick held off Daniel Suárez for his second All-Star Race win and the $1 million.

Round 13: Coca-Cola 600

Kyle Busch started on pole. Defending winner Austin Dillon got in the wall after having a tire go down early. Kevin Harvick got into the wall, taking him out of the race, as Busch won the first stage. William Byron had a tire go down and got into the wall. Jimmie Johnson spun after contact with Denny Hamlin and also sent Joey Logano spinning. Busch won the second stage. In the third stage, Gray Gaulding crashed and Chris Buescher spun. Kyle Larson spun and Ryan Blaney blew an engine and caught fire. Busch won the third stage. Kyle Busch continued to dominate and won his fourth race of the season and with the win, he became the first in history to win a race at every racetrack in the MENCS that he competed at.

Round 14: Pocono 400

Defending race winner Ryan Blaney started on pole. Blaney led early until he had a problem and had to pit. Martin Truex Jr. got the lead and won the first stage. Kevin Harvick got to the lead and dominated to win a caution free stage two. In the final stage, Matt DiBenedetto had brake issues and it caused a tire to catch fire as Kasey Kahne and Bubba Wallace both had transmission issues. Derrike Cope spun after contact with Kyle Larson and Denny Hamlin spun and crashed into the wall after contact with Alex Bowman. On the restart, Erik Jones spun after contact with Joey Logano. On the restart, Martin Truex Jr. pulled away from Larson, Harvick, and Kyle Busch to pick up his second win of the season and second at Pocono.

Round 15: FireKeepers Casino 400

Kurt Busch started on pole. The race started over two hours late due to rain. Austin Dillon and Ricky Stenhouse Jr. spun after making contact with each other just as the competition caution came out. David Ragan got into the wall after contact with Bubba Wallace Matt Kenseth spun at the end of the stage as Ryan Blaney, who had taken the lead from Kurt Busch, won the first stage. Daniel Suárez spun after contact with Paul Menard. Kyle Larson, who won the last three Michigan races, spun into the grass, ending his changes of a fourth straight win. Kevin Harvick won the second stage over his teammates. Clint Bowyer had taken the lead from Harvick as Ricky Stenhouse Jr. spun as rain was reported around the track. The race was called giving Bowyer his second win of the season.

Round 16: Toyota/Save Mart 350

Kyle Larson started on pole. Erik Jones had problems early as Martin Truex Jr. led most of the first stage, but pitted allowing A. J. Allmendinger to win the stage. On the restart, Allmendinger blew an engine while Jamie McMurray went to the garage with low oil pressure. Denny Hamlin won the second stage by staying out while others pitted. Ryan Blaney had to make several stops to fix damage. Kevin Harvick had the lead late until he decided to pit in case of a late caution. Truex stayed out during green flag pit stops and won his third win of the season and second at Sonoma with a ten-second lead over Harvick.

Round 17: Overton's 400

Paul Menard started the race on pole. Clint Bowyer led early in the race before getting two speeding penalties on pit road. Aric Almirola won Stage 1 and led the most laps the race, but had to pit under green for a loose wheel. Kevin Harvick won Stage 2 of the race. Harvick would continue to lead until losing it to Kyle Busch during a round of pit stops under caution. Kyle Busch continued to lead in the closing laps as Kyle Larson was catching him. Larson caught up to Kyle Busch on the final lap and the two made contact twice, with Kyle Busch holding on to win the race with Larson finishing second.

Round 18: Coke Zero Sugar 400

Chase Elliott started on pole. Ricky Stenhouse Jr. dominated by winning both stages. In the second stage, Paul Menard got turned and into the grass. Brad Keselowski got turned around and collected Kurt Busch, Joey Logano, Ryan Blaney, Denny Hamlin, Elliott, and others. Kyle Busch got turned into William Byron and also involved Jamie McMurray. In the final stage, Kyle Larson got turned into Stenhouse. Jimmie Johnson was leading until he received a penalty on pit road. Stenhouse had a tire go down and spun, ending his chance of back-to-back wins. On the restart, Aric Almirola lost a wheel and crashed along with Michael McDowell and Johnson. In overtime, Kevin Harvick took the lead from Kasey Kahne, but Clint Bowyer spun and collected Harvick, Brendan Gaughan, and others. On the second restart of overtime, Erik Jones drove past Martin Truex Jr. to score his first career win and became the seventh different winner of the season.

Round 19: Quaker State 400

Martin Truex Jr. started on pole. Truex dominated by leading the most laps and winning both stages. Alex Bowman had a tire go down and got into the wall and J. J. Yeley lost an engine. Teammates Jamie McMurray and Kyle Larson suffered mechanical problems. Truex pulled away from a charging Ryan Blaney for his fourth win of the season and second straight at Kentucky.

Round 20: Foxwoods Resort Casino 301

Kurt Busch started on pole. The start of the race was delayed due to rain. Busch dominated the majority of the race. A. J. Allmendinger got into the wall, ending his day. Martin Truex Jr. took the lead after the Competition Caution and won the first stage. Chase Elliott took the lead from Truex to win the second stage. Clint Bowyer got into the wall and went to the garage. Kyle Busch had the lead late, but Kevin Harvick moved Busch to take the lead and get his sixth win of the season and third at New Hampshire.

Round 21: Gander Outdoors 400

Kevin Harvick originally won the pole. Thirteen cars including Harvick failed post-qualifying inspection, disallowing their times and forcing them to start in the back, thus Daniel Suarez won the pole. Chase Elliott won the first stage while Harvick won the second stage. A few had tire problems including Kurt Busch, Joey Logano, and Brad Keselowski. Keselowski got into the wall, sending him to the garage. Bubba Wallace lost his brakes and hit the wall hard at a high speed, resulting in a red flag. On the restart, Aric Almirola spun after contact with Matt DiBenedetto, sending the race to overtime. Kyle Busch pulled away to hold off Daniel Suarez for his sixth win of the season and second at Pocono.

Round 22: Go Bowling at The Glen

Denny Hamlin started on pole. Aric Almirola got into the wall early and Joey Logano spun and went to the garage. Martin Truex Jr. won the first stage. Chase Elliott dominated the second half of the race and won the second stage. Ryan Newman spun and Jimmie Johnson spun after contact with A. J. Allmendinger. Martin Truex Jr. caught Elliott, but ran out of fuel, which allowed Chase Elliott to get his first career win and the 250th win for Hendrick Motorsports.

Round 23: Consumers Energy 400

Denny Hamlin started on pole for the second straight week. Erik Jones spun early and William Byron spun and got into the wall along with Martin Truex Jr. Kevin Harvick dominated and won both stages. Jones spun again and Ty Dillon ran over a battery and got into the wall and caught fire. Harvick took the lead from Jamie McMurray and held off Brad Keselowski for his seventh win of the season.

Round 24: Bass Pro Shops NRA Night Race

Kyle Larson started on pole. Kyle Busch spun and caused a pile up on the frontstretch, including Bubba Wallace. Paul Menard got into the wall while running up front as Ryan Blaney edged Kevin Harvick to win the first stage. Blaney, Joey Logano, Chase Elliott, Clint Bowyer, and others led up front. Logano won the second stage. Aric Almirola had mechanical problems that sent him to the garage. Martin Truex Jr. spun and crashed along with J. J. Yeley after getting into Kyle Busch. Busch and Brad Keselowski had tires go down and both spun. Kurt Busch was able to take the lead from Clint Bowyer and held off Kyle Larson for his first win of the season and sixth at Bristol.

Round 25: Bojangles' Southern 500

Denny Hamlin started on pole. Jimmie Johnson had fuel pump problems, sending him to the garage. Kyle Larson dominated and won both stages and led the most laps. Clint Bowyer got into the back of Ryan Newman, who slowed down to go to pit road. William Byron had the engine blew, sending him to the garage. Brad Keselowski beat out Kyle Larson on pit road and pulled away from teammate Joey Logano for his first win of the season.

Round 26: Big Machine Vodka 400 at the Brickyard

Kyle Busch started on pole after qualifying was cancelled due to rain. The race was postponed from Sunday to Monday due to rain. The race had two competition cautions at the beginning due to the rain. Martin Truex Jr. was sent to the garage early after a rotor exploded causing front end damage to the car. Clint Bowyer was able to win the first stage. Bubba Wallace spun and collided with David Starr. A. J. Allmendinger and Alex Bowman both wrecked off turn two. Matt Kenseth was able to win the second stage. In the final stage Clint Bowyer dominated and Denny Hamlin was able to grab the lead after the final round of green flag pit stops cycled through and was heading to the win until Landon Cassill wrecked along with Jeffrey Earnhardt. On the restart, Brad Keselowski, who had fresher tires, was able to take the lead from Hamlin and hold off Erik Jones for his second straight win and the first Brickyard 400 victory for Roger Penske and the first Brickyard win for Ford since 1999. Kyle Busch went on to capture the Regular-Season Championship over Kevin Harvick and the final two playoff spots went to Jimmie Johnson and Alex Bowman.

Round 27: South Point 400

Erik Jones started on pole. Kyle Larson had to make an unscheduled pit stop early for a flat right front tire. Martin Truex Jr. would grab the first stage. In the second stage, Kevin Harvick blew a tire and slammed the wall in turn 1 collecting polesitter Jones in the process. Brad Keselowski would win the second stage. The final stage had a number of wrecks that puts some playoff drivers in jeopardy, with Jamie McMurray wrecked in turn three hard collecting Chase Elliott as well. Kyle Busch later spun in turn four as well as Denny Hamlin later on in the same spot, but would suffer splitter damage ending his day. A late race restart caused Jimmie Johnson, Alex Bowman, and Kurt Busch to suffer tire rubs after contact in the back-straightaway. Joey Logano hit the wall late in turn two to bring out a caution with just a few laps remaining for an overtime restart. Keselowski would have great restart, but a multi-car wreck in turn four involving Michael McDowell, Kurt Busch, Matt DiBenedetto, and David Ragan, forcing another attempt. On the second attempt, Keselowski would go on to win the race over Larson to advance to the second round for his third win in a row as well as Team Penske's 500th win overall.

Round 28: Federated Auto Parts 400

Kevin Harvick started on pole. Denny Hamlin was spun by Ricky Stenhouse Jr., but was able to save it. Martin Truex Jr. dominated and won both stages, but an uncontrolled tire sent him to the back of the field. Matt Kenseth and Jeffrey Earnhardt go into each other, which sent Earnhardt in the wall. Kyle Busch was able to take the lead from Brad Keselowski and held off Harvick to advance to the next round of the playoffs for his seventh win of the season and his 50th career win overall.

Round 29: Bank of America Roval 400

Kurt Busch started on pole. Kyle Larson won stage one while Ryan Blaney won the second stage. Austin Dillon slammed the wall twice and got sent to the garage to end his playoff hopes. Aric Almirola and Chris Buescher spun and Ricky Stenhouse Jr. slammed the wall. At the end, leader Brad Keselowski lost control of his car on a restart and crashed into the wall along with Larson, Paul Menard, Kyle Busch, Daniel Hemric, Bubba Wallace, and others. Martin Truex Jr. and Jimmie Johnson were racing for the win until Johnson spun in the chicane and collected Truex. Ryan Blaney snuck through to win over Jamie McMurray for his second career win and advance in the playoffs. Dillon, Denny Hamlin, Erik Jones, and Johnson were eliminated.

Round 30: Gander Outdoors 400

Kyle Busch started on pole after qualifying was rained out. Jimmie Johnson had to go to the garage before the race and eventually returned to the race several laps down. Kevin Harvick took the lead and dominated, leading 286 laps and winning both stages. Harvick had trouble on pit road and fell back. Aric Almirola was heading to the win, but Clint Bowyer got into the wall. Almirola wrecked on the restart along with Brad Keselowski, Alex Bowman, Ryan Blaney, and Martin Truex Jr. In overtime, Chase Elliott held off Denny Hamlin to advance to the next round with his second win of the year and the second of his career.

Round 31: 1000Bulbs.com 500

Kurt Busch started on pole with all Stewart-Haas Racing drivers starting first through fourth. SHR dominated the race with Busch leading the most laps and winning stage one. Jimmie Johnson spun and hit the wall and Kyle Larson had a tire go down and spun. Kevin Harvick won the second stage. Jamie McMurray spun and got stuck in the grass. Late in the race, Alex Bowman got into the wall and collected J. J. Yeley and William Byron, which sent the race to overtime. Harvick, Ryan Blaney, and Brad Keselowski ran out of fuel before the restart. Matt DiBenedetto spun and collected several cars, but the race remained green. Kurt Busch ran out of fuel and it allowed teammate Aric Almirola to take the lead and hold off teammate Clint Bowyer to advance in the Round of 8 for his second career win and becoming the fourth SHR driver to win during the season.

Round 32: Hollywood Casino 400

Joey Logano started on pole. Daniel Suárez got into the wall as Bubba Wallace had a tire go down and William Byron suffered a blown engine with Logano winning the first stage. Kevin Harvick won the second stage and was leading when he got a speeding penalty on pit road. Chase Elliott was able to hold off Kyle Busch for his third win and his second in the "Round of 12". Brad Keselowski, Ryan Blaney, Kyle Larson, and Alex Bowman were eliminated from the playoffs.

Round 33: First Data 500

Kyle Busch started on pole. Jimmie Johnson spun after contact with Erik Jones as Denny Hamlin won the first stage. Joey Logano dominated the race and won the second stage. William Byron was spun on pit road after contact with Clint Bowyer. Kyle Larson had the engine blow and Timmy Hill had an electrical fire. Clint Bowyer made contact with Johnson and spun. Martin Truex Jr. took the lead from Logano, but Logano was able to pull the bump-and-run on Truex and held off Hamlin for his second win of the season and clinched a spot in the "Championship 4."

Round 34: AAA Texas 500

Ryan Blaney started on pole. William Byron spun after contact with teammate Jimmie Johnson. Kevin Harvick dominated by leading the most laps and winning both stages. Matt DiBenedetto made contact with Martin Truex Jr. and got into the wall. Joey Gase spun and collected Daniel Suarez, sending the race into overtime. Harvick held off Blaney to lock into the "Championship 4" for his eighth win of the season and second Playoff race at Texas. Due to an altered spoiler discovered post-race, Harvick had his win encumbered, was penalized 40 points, and was no longer locked into the Championship 4.

Round 35: Can-Am 500

Kevin Harvick started on pole. Harvick led all of the first stage until he had a flat tire and had to pit allowing Chase Elliott to win the first stage. Joey Logano had a tire go down and sent him to the garage. Clint Bowyer had a tire go down and got into the wall, ending his championship hopes. Ricky Stenhouse Jr. hit the wall and caught fire. Denny Hamlin got loose and collected Kurt Busch, Elliott, and others. Alex Bowman got into the wall and caught fire. Kyle Busch, who won the second stage, dominated the race and held off Brad Keselowski for his eighth win of the season and locking into the "Championship 4" along with Logano, Harvick, and Martin Truex Jr. while Elliott, Aric Almirola, Bowyer, and Kurt Busch were eliminated.

Round 36: Ford EcoBoost 400

Denny Hamlin started on pole. The Championship 4 dominated the race with Kevin Harvick winning the first stage. Kyle Larson won the second stage after passing Harvick at the line. Larson got into the wall after having a tire go down. Erik Jones and Chris Buescher both had flat tires, but got to pit road before a caution. Daniel Suarez got into the wall after contact with Brad Keselowski. Joey Logano, who led the most laps, took the lead from Martin Truex Jr. and pulled away from his third win of the season and winning the Monster Energy NASCAR Cup Series Championship.

Results and standings

Race results

Drivers' Championship

(key) Bold – Pole position awarded by time. Italics – Pole position set by final practice results or owner's points. * – Most laps led. 1 – Stage 1 winner. 2 – Stage 2 winner. 3 – Stage 3 winner. 1–10 - Regular season top 10 finishers.

. – Eliminated after Round of 16
. – Eliminated after Round of 12
. – Eliminated after Round of 8

Notes

Manufacturers' championship

Contingency Awards

See also

 2018 NASCAR Xfinity Series
 2018 NASCAR Camping World Truck Series
 2018 NASCAR K&N Pro Series East
 2018 NASCAR K&N Pro Series West
 2018 NASCAR Whelen Modified Tour
 2018 NASCAR Pinty's Series
 2018 NASCAR PEAK Mexico Series
 2018 NASCAR Whelen Euro Series

References

 

NASCAR Cup Series seasons